Freeborn Garrettson Jewett (August 4, 1791 in Sharon, Litchfield County, Connecticut – January 27, 1858 in Skaneateles, Onondaga County, New York) was an American lawyer and politician who served as a U.S. Representative from New York and was the first Chief Judge of the New York Court of Appeals.

Life
Jewett was born in Sharon, Connecticut on August 4, 1791, a son of Abigail Sears Jewett and Alpheus Jewett. He moved to Skaneateles in 1815, and was appointed a Justice of the Peace in 1817. He studied law, first with Henry Swift of Dutchess County, then with Samuel Young of Ballston Spa. He was admitted to the bar in 1818 and commenced practice in Skaneateles as the partner of James Porter. From 1824 to 1831 he was Surrogate of Onondaga County.

Political career 
He was a member from Onondaga County of the New York State Assembly in 1826. He was a presidential elector in 1828.

Congress 
Jewett was elected as a Jacksonian to the 22nd United States Congress, holding office from March 4, 1831 to March 3, 1833.

He was Inspector of Auburn Prison in 1838 and 1839, and District Attorney of Onondaga County in 1839. He was appointed an associate justice of the New York Supreme Court on March 5, 1845.

Judge 
On June 7, 1847, Jewett was elected one of the first judges of the New York State Court of Appeals. On June 22, he drew the shortest term (2 years and a half), and when the judges took office on July 5, he became the first Chief Judge. 

He was re-elected in 1849 to an eight-year term, but resigned in June 1853 on account of ill health.

Death 
He was buried at Lake View Cemetery in Skaneateles.

Legacy 
Justice Jewett is the namesake of Jewett, New York.

Notes and references

 Political Graveyard

The New York Civil List compiled by Franklin Benjamin Hough (pages 284, 348 and 415; Weed, Parsons and Co., 1858)
 Obit in NYT on January 30, 1858 (giving wrong middle initial "J.", and almost all years given are wrong)

1791 births
1858 deaths
Chief Judges of the New York Court of Appeals
Onondaga County District Attorneys
New York Supreme Court Justices
People from Sharon, Connecticut
People from Skaneateles, New York
1828 United States presidential electors
Burials in New York (state)
Jacksonian members of the United States House of Representatives from New York (state)
19th-century American politicians
Members of the United States House of Representatives from New York (state)